Cabre may refer to:

In people
 Chase Cabre (born 1997), American stock car racing drive
 Encarnación Cabré (1911-2005), Spanish archaeologist
 Jaume Cabré (born 1947), Catalan philologist, novelist and screenwriter
 Josep Cabré (born 1956), Catalan bass-baritone singer and choral conductor
 Manuel Cabré
 Maria Teresa Cabré (born 1947) is a Catalan linguist
 Nicolás Cabré (born 1980), Argentine actor and television host

In other
 Cabre language, extinct Arawakan language of Colombia